Odonymy refers to the street or road naming conventions in the toponymy of the United Kingdom.

History 

Studied by the English Place-Name Society.

Many towns (particularly in England) will refer to their main thoroughfare as the High Street or Main Street, and many of the ways leading off it will be suffixed "Road".

In the City of London, according to tradition, there are no "Roads"; all the streets there are called "Street", "Lane", "Court", "Hill", "Row" or "Alley", or have no suffix (e.g. Cheapside). However, since 1994, part of Goswell Road now lies in the City of London, making this a unique anomaly.

Culture 
Occasionally, some road names that were originally named in an innocuous way are nowadays considered rude.

Road numbering

List

London

 Street names of Belgravia
 Street names of Bloomsbury
 Street names of Clerkenwell and Finsbury
 Street names of Covent Garden
 Street names of Fitzrovia
 Street names of Holborn
 Street names of Kennington and Lambeth
 Street names of Lisson Grove
 Street names of Marylebone
 Street names of Mayfair
 Street names of Pimlico and Victoria
 Street names of Regent's Park
 Street names of Sheffield
 Street names of Soho
 Street names of Southwark
 Street names of the City of London
 Street names of Vauxhall
 Street names of Waterloo
 Street names of Westminster

Statistics 
The top 15 most-common street names are:

 High Street
 Station Road
 Main Street
 Park Road
 Church Road
 Church Street
 London Road
 Victoria Road
 Green Lane
 Manor Road
 Church Lane
 Park Avenue
 The Avenue
 The Crescent
 Queens Road

References

See also 

 Odonymy
 Odonymy in France
 Lists of roads in the United Kingdom
 List of road junctions in the United Kingdom

English toponymy
British culture
British toponymy